Hiram Gabriel Bocachica Colón (born March 4, 1976) is a Puerto Rican former professional baseball outfielder. He played in Major League Baseball (MLB) for the Los Angeles Dodgers, Detroit Tigers, Seattle Mariners, Oakland Athletics, and San Diego Padres. Bocachica also played for the Saitama Seibu Lions of Nippon Professional Baseball (NPB).

Career

Major league career
He was drafted by the Montreal Expos in the first round (21st overall) of the 1994 Major League Baseball draft and played for the Detroit Tigers, Los Angeles Dodgers, and Seattle Mariners before being released in 2005 and signed by Oakland Athletics from free agency.

Bocachica impressed scouts with his amazing spring training performance of 2006, and would have been on the MLB roster for that season, had he not suffered from a bone growth in his right hand. He was claimed off waivers by the San Diego Padres on May 31, 2007. He became a free agent at the end of the season.

Nippon Professional Baseball
Bocachica signed with the Saitama Seibu Lions on December 3, 2007. Despite playing only 78 games during the 2008 season, he hit 20 home runs, including one in the seventh game of the Japan Series, which the team won.

Atlantic League
On April 12, 2010, Bocachica, along with fellow MLB alums Brian Barton and Tike Redman, was signed by the Bridgeport Bluefish for the 2010 season.

Immediately upon arriving in New York, Hiram was called by a friend who was coaching in Mexico.  He briefly played with the Broncos de Reynosa in Mexico, but later returned to Bridgeport.

Family
Hiram is married to his wife Jocelyn and has two daughters and a son.

See also
 List of Major League Baseball players from Puerto Rico

References

External links

1976 births
Living people
Albany Polecats players
Albuquerque Dukes players
Arizona League Athletics players
Bridgeport Bluefish players
Broncos de Reynosa players
Detroit Tigers players
Diablos Rojos del México players
Gulf Coast Expos players
Harrisburg Senators players
Major League Baseball outfielders
Major League Baseball players from Puerto Rico
Mexican League baseball outfielders
Mexican League baseball third basemen
Leones de Yucatán players
Los Angeles Dodgers players
Oakland Athletics players
Ottawa Lynx players
Petroleros de Minatitlán players
Portland Beavers players
Puerto Rican expatriate baseball players in Canada
Puerto Rican expatriate baseball players in Japan
Puerto Rican expatriate baseball players in Mexico
Sacramento River Cats players
Saitama Seibu Lions players
San Antonio Missions players
San Diego Padres players
Seattle Mariners players
Stockton Ports players
Tacoma Rainiers players
Toledo Mud Hens players
West Palm Beach Expos players
2009 World Baseball Classic players